Pseudagrion superbum is a species of damselfly in the family Coenagrionidae. It is endemic to the Democratic Republic of the Congo.  Its natural habitat is rivers.

References

Fauna of the Democratic Republic of the Congo
Coenagrionidae
Endemic fauna of the Democratic Republic of the Congo
Insects described in 1956
Taxonomy articles created by Polbot